Rhizoplaca is a genus of lichenized fungi in the  family Lecanoraceae. Members of the genus are commonly called rimmed navel lichens because of their umbilicate growth form and lecanorine (rimmed with thallus-like tissue)apothecia, also rock-posy lichen and rockbright. The genus has a widespread distribution and contains 11 species.

References

Lecanoraceae
Lecanorales genera
Lichen genera
Taxa named by Friedrich Wilhelm Zopf
Taxa described in 1905